Irving Robert Kaufman (June 24, 1910 – February 1, 1992) was a United States circuit judge of the United States Court of Appeals for the Second Circuit and a United States District Judge of the United States District Court for the Southern District of New York.

Background

Born to a Jewish family in Brooklyn, New York City, New York, Kaufman received a Bachelor of Laws from Fordham University School of Law in 1931. He was Jewish, but earned the nickname "Pope Kaufman" for his achievement in the required Christian doctrine classes at Fordham, a Catholic school.

Career

Kaufman entered private practice of law in New York City from 1932 to 1935. He was a Special Assistant United States Attorney of the Southern District of New York from 1935 to 1939. He returned to private practice in New York City from 1940 to 1949. He was an Assistant United States Attorney from 1939 to 1940. He was Special Assistant to the Attorney General of the United States from 1947 to 1948.

Judge of the United States District Court for the Southern District of New York

Kaufman received a recess appointment from President Harry S. Truman on October 21, 1949, to the United States District Court for the Southern District of New York, to a new seat created by 63 Stat. 493. He was nominated to the same seat by President Truman on January 5, 1950. He was confirmed by the United States Senate on April 4, 1950, and received his commission on April 7, 1950. His service was terminated on September 22, 1961, due to elevation to the Second Circuit.  Notable cases included:
 1951:  Kaufman is best remembered as the judge who presided over the espionage trial of Julius and Ethel Rosenberg and imposed their controversial death sentences. Roy Cohn, one of the prosecutors in the case, claimed in his autobiography that his influence led to Kaufman's being appointed to the case, and that Kaufman had imposed the death penalty on Cohn's personal advice.  This claim has not been verified, although it has been shown that after Kaufman learned that the FBI and Justice Department opposed death penalties in the case, he asked the prosecution to withhold its recommendation before issuing his death sentence. In his summing up Judge Irving Kaufman was considered by many to have been highly subjective: "Judge Kaufman tied the crimes the Rosenbergs were being accused of to their ideas and the fact that they were sympathetic to the Soviet Union. He stated that they had given the atomic bomb to the Russians, which had triggered Communist aggression in Korea resulting in over 50,000 American casualties. He added that, because of their treason, the Soviet Union was threatening America with an atomic attack and this made it necessary for the United States to spend enormous amounts of money to build underground bomb shelters." Kaufman said that he had gone to synagogue to pray before issuing his death sentence; this enraged Supreme Court justice Felix Frankfurter, who later wrote to judge Learned Hand, "I despise a judge who feels God told him to impose a death sentence," and also told Hand that he was "mean enough" to stay on the court long enough to prevent Kaufman from having a chance to take Frankfurter's place in the so-called "Jewish seat" on the Court.
 1959:  Kaufman presided over the jury trial in the federal government's conspiracy case against twenty-one of the Apalachin meeting delegates. The guilty verdicts of twenty of the men, and the stiff sentences Kaufman meted out, were later reversed and invalidated by the Court of Appeals.

Judge of the United States Court of Appeals for the Second Circuit
Kaufman was nominated by President John F. Kennedy on September 14, 1961, to the United States Court of Appeals for the Second Circuit, to a new seat created by 75 Stat. 80. He was confirmed by the Senate on September 21, 1961, and received his commission on September 22, 1961. He served as Chief Judge from 1973 to 1980. He assumed senior status on July 1, 1987. His service was terminated on February 1, 1992, due to his death.  Notable cases included:
 1964:  Kaufman wrote the Second Circuit's opinion in Irving Berlin et al. v. E.C. Publications, Inc., a case that helped establish the legal precedent for the right to parody.
 1966:  Kaufman wrote an opinion in the case of United States v. Freeman 357 F.2d 606 (2d Cir. 1966). The judgment over-turned the rigid M'Naghten standard for insanity defense and adopted the modern insanity defense described in Section 4.01 of Model Penal Code developed by the American Law Institute. The judgment embraced advances in psychiatry and emphatically rejected the M'Naghten test by stating that, "the outrage of a frightened Queen has for far too long caused us to forego the expert guidance that modern psychiatry is able to provide."
 1974:  Kaufman was the chief judge in the decision (Coniglio v. Highwood Services, 1974)  that prevents Professional Football  fans from gaining redress against the NFL's policy requiring them to purchase seats for exhibition games at regular-season prices in order to qualify for season tickets.
 1975:  Kaufman presided over the three-judge appeals court panel reviewing the deportation of John Lennon and rejected the government's attempt to deport him from the United States to the United Kingdom based upon his having pleaded guilty in England to possession of hashish. After a widely publicized argument, Kaufman found that Lennon had been singled out for deportation for political reasons, allowed him to remain in the United States on what some observers characterized as a technicality, and criticized what he called the "labyrinthine provisions of the Immigration and Naturalization Act."
 1980:  Kaufman also wrote an opinion in the case of Filártiga v. Peña-Irala, 630 F.2d 876 (2d Cir. 1980). The case opened U.S. courts to foreigners who were tortured in other countries. The case has had a wide-ranging impact on human rights and the role of corporations and their foreign operations.

Death

Kaufman died age 81 on February 1, 1992, at Mount Sinai Medical Center in Manhattan of pancreatic cancer.

Awards

On October 7, 1987, Kaufman was presented with the Presidential Medal of Freedom by President Ronald Reagan.

Legacy

A substantial collection of Kaufman's personal and judicial papers is archived at the Library of Congress in Washington, D.C., but is not yet fully open for research.

Kaufman had been known to lament what he regarded as the distortion of judicial opinion and finding, as it passed through the filter of the media: "The judge is forced for the most part to reach his audience through the medium of the press whose reporting of judicial decisions is all too often inaccurate and superficial."

See also
 List of Jewish American jurists

References

External links
 
 University of Missouri-Kansas City law school biography

1910 births
1992 deaths
Judges of the United States District Court for the Southern District of New York
United States district court judges appointed by Harry S. Truman
20th-century American judges
Judges of the United States Court of Appeals for the Second Circuit
United States court of appeals judges appointed by John F. Kennedy
Julius and Ethel Rosenberg
Fordham University School of Law alumni
Jewish American attorneys
20th-century American lawyers
Presidential Medal of Freedom recipients
Assistant United States Attorneys
Lawyers from New York City
Deaths from cancer in New York (state)
[[Category:Deaths from pancreatic cancer\\